In Manitoba, counties were originally only organized for judicial purposes. Between 1875 and 1890, they also existed for municipal purposes.

History
In 1875, provision was made for a majority of the electors in a judicial county to petition to have it organized for municipal purposes. By 1881, the Legislative Assembly of Manitoba passed legislation to redivide the entire Province into municipal counties, as a consequence of its enlargement.

They existed only until 1890, though the term itself lived on with respect to the County Courts and land registration districts.

Organization
The Municipal Act, 1886 listed the counties of Manitoba as follows:

County No. 4 (Varennes), created in 1881, occupied that part of Manitoba around Rat Portage, in an area disputed with Ontario. It was abolished subsequent to the Judicial Committee of the Privy Council's decision in 1884 to award the territory to Ontario, later confirmed by the Canada (Ontario Boundary) Act 1889.

Further reading

References

Geography of Manitoba
Manitoba